Ouaguenoun is a district in Algeria. It is located east of Tizi Ouzou. Its central town is Tikobain. Villages in Ouaguenoune include Ighil Bouchene. 

Districts of Tizi Ouzou Province